An Epitaph may refer to:

"An Epitaph", classical song by Ivor Gurney
"An Epitaph" (Darkest Hour song)
An Epitaph (album), live album by Antimatter
An Epitaph for George Dillon